Mary Farrand Rogers Miller (April 21, 1868 – 1971) was an American writer, naturalist, and educator. She authored The Brook Book (1902) and Outdoor Work (1911), as well as magazine articles and educational pamphlets.

Biography 
Mary Farrand Rogers was born April 21, 1868, on a farm in Dallas County, Iowa, to Daniel Farrand and Ruth Dodd (Llewellyn) Rogers. Her father was a pioneer farmer and teacher from Illinois, the son of abolitionist Nathaniel Peabody Rogers, and her mother was a teacher. Mary was the third child in a family of three daughters and five sons. Her older sister, Julia Ellen, would also become a nature writer and teacher.

At the age of seventeen Mary Rogers commenced teaching, and spent several years teaching in rural, village and city schools of Iowa and Minnesota. After preparatory study at Iowa State College, she entered Cornell University in 1893. In her senior year she was elected to the Sigma Xi fraternity. That same year she was appointed laboratory assistant in the department of entomology, and did instructor's work in that department during summer terms. In 1896 she was graduated with the degree of Bachelor of Science. In 1897, when Cornell began extension classes in the College of Agriculture, she was appointed lecturer in Nature Study. In the summer of 1899 and 1900, she taught in the Cornell Summer School with the rank of instructor.

On June 8, 1899, she was married to Wilhelm Tyler Miller, a horticulturist who became a noted landscape architect and editor of Country Life in America and The Garden Magazine. They had two children. In 1903, the Millers moved to New York City, and later to New Jersey.

In 1920, she moved with her husband to Los Angeles, where she became lecturer with the University of California Extension.
 
Later in life after experiencing hearing loss, she became active in deaf education and advocacy. She taught classes in lip reading. She was President of the Los Angeles League for the Hard of Hearing. In 1947 she became head of the Pacific branch of the American Hearing Society.  She served as a vice president of the American Hearing Society, president of the Southern California Hearing Council and was a member of the American Association of University Women and United Nations Association.

Her husband died in 1936, and Miller died in Los Angeles in 1971, at the age of 103.

References

1868 births
1971 deaths
American nature writers
Cornell University alumni
Cornell University faculty
Deaf writers
People from Dallas County, Iowa
People from San Pedro, Los Angeles